This is a list of Danish television related events from 1988.

Events
27 February - Hot Eyes are selected to represent Denmark at the 1988 Eurovision Song Contest with their song "Ka' du se hva' jeg sa'?". They are selected to be the twenty-first Danish Eurovision entry during Dansk Melodi Grand Prix held at the DR Studios in Copenhagen.
1 October - TV2 starts broadcasting, thereby ending the 37-year monopoly held by DR on national television broadcasting.

Debuts

Television shows

Births

Deaths

See also
1988 in Denmark